Jianqiao is a town located in Fengshun County, Meizhou City, Guangdong Province, China. It has an area of 94.1 square kilometers and a population of 28,763.

See also 
List of township-level divisions of Guangdong

References

External links 
Official website of the Fengshun County Government

Towns in Guangdong

Fengshun County